Wilfred Holroyd (14 December 1877 – 3 November 1961) was a British fencer. He competed in the individual foil event at the 1904 Summer Olympics.

References

External links
 

1877 births
1961 deaths
British male fencers
English emigrants to the United States
Olympic fencers of Great Britain
Fencers at the 1904 Summer Olympics
Sportspeople from Manchester